Orvasca subnotata is a nygmiine tussock moth in the family Erebidae, found in Indomalaya and East Asia, where it is known as a pest that feeds on millets. The species was first described by Francis Walker in 1865.

References

External links
 

Lymantriinae
Moths described in 1865
Insect pests of millets